Universal TV, formerly Universal Channel, is an international pay television network specializing in movies and television series in the thriller, drama, comedy, horror, crime and investigation genres, owned by NBCUniversal International Networks, a division of NBCUniversal and available on satellite and cable platforms. They were formerly branded as USA Network until 2003 when the name was changed to take more advantage of the Universal branding, but continue programming as that network does like a general interest network.

Launched in other countries

Original launch
Universal Channel was officially launched on 1 September 2004 in Latin America, then it launched on 1 December 2007 in Poland (as Kanał Universal) and Romania (as Canalul Universal) and on 1 July 2008 in Southeast Asia.

Re-branded in selected countries
In South Africa, Hallmark Channel was re-branded under that name on 24 March 2010 for DStv subscribers. In Japan, Sci Fi Channel re-branded to that name on 1 April 2010. In Australia, Hallmark Channel re-branded to that name on 1 July 2010. In Hungary (as Universal Csatorna), Czech Republic, Slovakia and ex Yugoslav countries Serbia, Croatia and Bosnia and Herzegovina, Hallmark Channel was re-branded to that name on 3 September 2010. And in the Philippines, this channel was launched on 26 July 2010 and replaced the Sci Fi Channel which was rebranded as Universal Channel.

On 18 October 2010, the Hallmark Channel in the UK and Ireland was rebranded, adopting the Universal Channel name. The UK version closed on 27 January 2020. On 3 May 2018, starting with the UK, they have begun the global rebrand of the channel as 'Universal TV'. In August 2018, the Brazilian signal of Universal Channel was rebranded to Universal TV, with the Latin American variant following suit in October.

Universal TV’s Launch in New Zealand
In 2021, SkyTV New Zealand and NBCUniversal had signed a multi-year deal allowing Sky to broadcast their new movies, programmes and content while also taking into affect their current catalogue. Therefore, releasing Universal TV to New Zealand audiences as a part of Sky New Zealand’s Starter pack.

Universal Channel and E!’s Closure in Russia
On April 30, 2015, Universal Channel was closed during technical problems, along with E!.

Universal Channels around the world

Programmes

Latin America 
 Bates Motel
 Beauty & the Beast
 Chicago Fire
 Chicago P.D.
 Elementary
 Grimm
 House
 Law & Order: Special Victims Unit
 The Librarians
 Rookie Blue
 Stalker
 The Rookie

Poland
 Arrow
 A Touch of Frost
 Californication
 Castle
 CSI: Miami
 Dexter
 Royal Pains
 Scandal
 Hawaii Five-0
 Law & Order
 Monk
 Psych
 Sleeper Cell
 Stargate Universe
 The Sopranos

Czech Republic, Slovakia, Hungary, Serbia, Croatia, Bosnia and Slovenia
 Being Erica
 Blue Bloods
 Brothers & Sisters
 Diagnosis Murder
 ER
 Foyle's War
 Fact or Faked: Paranormal Files
 Fairly Legal
 Haven
 Hawaii Five-0
 Law & Order
 Law & Order: Special Victims Unit
 Law & Order: Criminal Intent
 McLeod's Daughters
 Medium
 Midsomer Murders
 Monk
 Nash Bridges
 Psych
 Rookie Blue
 Royal Pains
 Scandal
 Sea Patrol
 Shattered
 The Good Wife
 The Guardian
 The Real Housewives of Orange County
 Three Rivers
 Who Do You Think You Are?

Greece
 30 Rock
 Boy Meets Girl
 Columbo
 Cops
 Covert Affairs
 Destination Truth
 Eureka
 Fact or Faked: Paranormal Files
 Fairly Legal
 Flashpoint
 Flipping Out
 Haven
 House M.D.
 Impact
 In Plain Sight
 Kath & Kim
 Law & Order
 Law & Order: LA
 Law & Order: UK
 Malcolm in the Middle
 Miami Social
 Million Dollar Listing
 Monk
 My Name Is Earl
 Nurse Jackie
 Parenthood
 Psych
 Rookie Blue
 Sanctuary
 Sea Patrol
 Shattered
 The Office
 The Philanthropist

Portugal
America's Next Top Model
Brooklyn 11223
Castle
Charmed
Chicago P.D.
Chuck
Covert Affairs
ER
Fairly Legal
Falling Skies
Grey’s Anatomy
Heroes
House, M.D.
Last Resort
Law & Order 
Law & Order: Criminal Intent
Law & Order: Special Victims Unit
Law & Order: Trial by Jury
Life
Memphis Beat
Midsomer Murders
Modern Family
Monk
Nurse Jackie
Parenthood
Partners
Psych
The Real Housewives of Atlanta
The Real Housewives of Orange County
Ringer
Rookie Blue 
Royal Pains 
Sea Patrol 
Shattered 
Smash 
Stars Earn Stripes 
Suits 
Trauma

United Kingdom
Bates Motel
Burden of Truth
Chance
Chicago Justice
Chicago Med
Coroner
CSI: Miami
Departure
The Finder
Gone
House
How to Get Away with Murder
Law & Order
Law & Order: Criminal Intent
Law & Order: LA
Law & Order: Special Victims Unit 
Major Crimes 
McLeod's Daughters
Motive
Mr. Robot
NCIS
Private Eyes 
Proven Innocent
Psych
Pure Genius
Ransom
Rookie Blue
Royal Pains
Shattered
Sleepy Hollow 
The Resident
Without a Trace

Southeast Asia
 American Gladiators (2008 TV series)
 Australian Gladiators
 Criminal Minds
 Crusoe
 Flashpoint
 The Event
 Greek
 House
 I Survived a Japanese Game Show
 Law & Order
 Law & Order: Criminal Intent
 Law & Order: Special Victims Unit
 Life
 The Murdoch Mysteries
 The Office
 The Pretender
 Profiler
 Psych
 The Secret Life of the American Teenager

South Africa
 Being Erica
 CSI:NY
 Flashpoint
 House
 Law & Order
 Law & Order: Criminal Intent
 Law & Order: Special Victims Unit
 Men in Trees
 The Mentalist
 Monk
 NCIS
 Numb3rs
 Psych
 Ransom
 The Detail
 Two and a Half Men
 Wild at Heart

Australia
 A Country Practice
 All Saints
 Always Greener
 Bloodletting & Miraculous Cures
 Blue Heelers
 Brothers & Sisters
 City Homicide
 Dirty Sexy Money
 Hawthorne
 McLeod's Daughters
 Packed to the Rafters
 Police Rescue
 Rush
 SeaChange
 Sea Patrol
 Stingers
 The Secret Life of Us
 Water Rats

New Zealand
 Chicago P.D.
 Chicago Fire
 Chicago Med
 House
 Law & Order: Criminal Intent
 Law & Order: Special Victims Unit
 Monk

Former shows
 Astro Boy (a)
 Brothers & Sisters(b)
 Dalziel & Pascoe (a)
 Family Guy (a)
 Forensic Files, under the Medical Detectives title(b)
 Greek(b)
 Heroes(b)
 Missing (b)
 Monk(b)
 Psych(b) (moved to Studio Universal)
 Pushing Daisies (b)
 Quarterlife (b)
 Shattered (2010 TV series)(b)
 Smash(b) (moved to Studio Universal)
 Surface (b)
 Surviving Suburbia (a)
 The Event(b)
 The Good Wife(b) (moved to Studio Universal)
 The Secret Life of the American Teenager(b)
 The Woody Woodpecker Show (a)
 Three Rivers(b)
 Walker Texas Ranger (a)
 World's Wildest Police Videos(b)
 Worst Week (a)

Selected territories:

(a) - Latin America (b) - Southeast Asia

See also
 Universal TV (UK and Ireland)
 Universal Channel (Asia)
 Universal TV (Australia)
 Universal Channel (Greece)
 Universal Channel (Japan)
 Universal TV (New Zealand)
 Universal TV (Turkey)

References

External links
Universal TV Latin America
Universal TV Brazil
Universal TV South Africa

Spanish-language television stations
Portuguese-language television stations in Brazil
Russian-language television stations
Turkish-language television stations
NBCUniversal networks
Television channels and stations established in 2004
Globosat
Grupo Globo subsidiaries